Pianguan County is a county in the northwest of Shanxi province, China, bordering Inner Mongolia to the northwest. It is under the administration of Xinzhou city, and is its northernmost county-level division.

Climate

References

www.xzqh.org 

County-level divisions of Shanxi
Xinzhou